Thomas Bolyn Smothers III (born February 2, 1937) is an American comedian, composer and musician, best known as half of the musical comedy duo the Smothers Brothers, alongside his younger brother Dick.

Early life

Smothers was born in 1937 at the Fort Jay army post hospital on Governors Island in New York City, the son of Ruth (née Remick), a homemaker; and Major Thomas B. Smothers, an army officer who died a POW, of the Japanese, in April 1945. After moving to California, he graduated from Redondo Union High School in Redondo Beach, California. He was a competitive unicyclist, and a state champion gymnast in the parallel bars. Smothers later attended San José State University, then known as San José State College. At SJSC, Smothers participated both in gymnastics and pole vault for the track team.

Career

The Smothers Brothers initially wanted to be folk musicians. Tom did not feel that he was good enough to be a professional musician, but he was funny enough to do comedy. The two began adding comedy bits to their act.

Tom's first foray into the medium of television was as a regular on The Steve Allen Show in 1961. He followed that role with a single episode of Burke's Law.

The Smothers Brothers next appeared on the CBS sitcom The Smothers Brothers Show from 1965 to 1966. Tom felt that the show did not play to the brothers' strengths and wanted creative control over their next venture.

The Smothers Brothers Comedy Hour and aftermath

Tom Smothers negotiated creative control over their next CBS show, a variety show entitled The Smothers Brothers Comedy Hour in 1967. The documentary Smothered describes how the brothers (particularly Tom) fought CBS censors to sneak in references to religion, recreational drugs, sex, and the Vietnam War. Smothers is widely quoted as saying: "The only valid censorship of ideas is the right of people not to listen." The brothers' oppositional politics led to their show's demise, with David Steinberg later claiming "The most innovative variety show on television shut down because of political pressure". During the same years, Tom wrote and recorded mainstream songs, such as "Can't Help Falling in Love with You." Tom has since stated, "When the Smothers Brothers came on the air we had no political point of view or social consciousness, it just evolved as the show was on the air."

Rock and Roll, "Give Peace a Chance"

Smothers introduced some musical acts at the Monterey Pop Festival in 1967. As he became more politically active, he befriended similarly inclined celebrities like John Lennon. 

In 1969, Smothers played guitar on Lennon's recording of his single "Give Peace a Chance" (his name was also mentioned in the song). The song was written and performed during Lennon's and Yoko Ono's 'Bed-In' honeymoon on June 1, 1969, in Room 1742 at the Queen Elizabeth Hotel in Montreal, Quebec, Canada. Smothers can be seen in the hotel room in the 1988 documentary film Imagine: John Lennon.

Political involvement

After the show was canceled, Tom became more strident in his politics.

In the 1970s, Smothers chided popular comedian Bill Cosby for not taking a stand on political issues of the day such as civil rights.

In October 1976, both Cosby and Smothers were in attendance at a Playboy Mansion party. The tension between the two culminated in Cosby's punching Smothers in the head.

Tom Smothers's politics are in marked contrast to those of his brother Dick, whom Tom describes as "more conservative". Tom openly protested Democratic president Lyndon B. Johnson and his involvement in and perpetuation of the Vietnam war. Tom stated in 2006 that the duo's real-life political and philosophical differences were a key part of their ability to maintain their act for as long as they did.

Film roles

In motion pictures, Tom Smothers portrayed corporate-executive-turned-tap-dancing-magician Donald Beeman in one of Brian De Palma's earlier films, Get to Know Your Rabbit (1972). He also played a banker in Silver Bears. He later portrayed Spike in Serial (1980).

In 1973, he voiced Ted E. Bear (Theodore Edward Bear) in the DePatie-Freleng NBC animated Christmas special The Bear Who Slept Through Christmas. Ten years later, he voiced Ted E. Bear again for its Halloween sequel The Great Bear Scare.

In 1980 Smothers starred in the film There Goes the Bride. In 1982 he played with an ensemble cast in Pandemonium in which he was a brave Canadian Mountie chasing down a serial killer at a cheerleader camp. He also voiced one of the characters in the cartoon Christmas movie Precious Moments: Timmy's Special Delivery in 1993.

Later work

In 2007, Tom and Dick Smothers filmed a series of 30-second commercials and promotional spots for the River Rock Casino in Geyserville, California.

To augment their act in recent years, "Yo-Yo Man" became part of their shows.  Tom Smothers had created the mostly non-speaking character in the late '60s, a comedic performer of tricks using a yo-yo.  The term "Yo-Yo Man" is registered in his name. In their 2008 tour, Yo-Yo Man was listed as the group's opening act.

In 2008, during the 60th Primetime Emmy Awards, Smothers was awarded a special Emmy.  In 1969, when he was head writer of The Smothers Brothers Comedy Hour, the writing staff was awarded the Emmy for Outstanding Writing in a Comedic Series. Smothers had refused to let his name be on the list of writers nominated for the Emmy, because he felt his name was too volatile. The award at the 2008 ceremony was presented by Steve Martin, who was one of the writers who originally won the award.

In December 2009, Tom and Dick both guest starred in a 21st-season episode of The Simpsons that also featured Cooper, Peyton and Eli Manning.

On May 6, 2011, the American Civil Liberties Union's Sonoma County chapter honored Smothers with its Jack Green Civil Liberties Award for his work against television censorship and for speaking out for peace and civil liberties.

Tom and Dick Smothers reunited in 2019 to mark the 50th anniversary of The Smothers Brothers Comedy Hour's abrupt cancellation.

On the December 11, 2022, episode of CBS News Sunday Morning, the brothers announced that they would be going on tour in 2023.

Personal life

Smothers is the owner of Remick Ridge Vineyards in Sonoma County, California, with his wife, Marcy Carriker,  and two children, Bo (born 1991) and Riley Rose (born 1996). He also has a son, Thomas Bolyn Smothers IV (Tom Jr.), from his first marriage, and one grandson, Phoenix Parrish-Smothers.  There is a Smothers sister, Sherry, born in September 1941 in Pasadena, California.

See also

 List of celebrities who own wineries and vineyards

References

Sources

 
 
 The Smothers Brothers at TV Party
 
 Tommy Smothers quotes at ThinkExist
 
 
 Tom Smothers interviewed by 'Jerry Jazz Musician'

1937 births
American comedy musicians
American male composers
21st-century American composers
American sketch comedians
Television personalities from California
Living people
Musicians from New York City
Musicians from Redondo Beach, California
San Jose State University alumni
21st-century American male musicians